Naghi may refer to:

Ali Naghi (disambiguation), a given name and place name
Naghi Sheykhzamanli, Azerbaijani political figure and the head of the counterintelligence service of Azerbaijan 
Naghi (surname)

See also
Nagui, another spelling variant of "Naqi"